DZYM is the callsign of the Radio Corporation of the Philippines' two stations in San Jose, Occidental Mindoro: 

 DZYM-AM, branded as Radyo Pilipino
 DZYM-FM, branded as One FM